Sunset Pass is a lost 1929 American silent Western film directed by Otto Brower. It stars Jack Holt, Nora Lane, and John Loder.

Cast
 Jack Holt as Jack Rock
 Nora Lane sa Leatrice Preston
 John Loder as Ashleigh Preston
 Christian J. Frank as Chuck
 Gilbert Holmes as Shorty (credited as Pee Wee Holmes)
 Chester Conklin as Windy
 Pat Harmon as Clink Peeples
 Alfred Allen as Amos Dabb
 Guy Oliver as Clark
 Dannie Mac Grant (uncredited)
 James Pier Mason (uncredited)

References

External links
 
 

1929 films
1929 Western (genre) films
American black-and-white films
Films based on works by Zane Grey
Films directed by Otto Brower
Lost American films
Lost Western (genre) films
1929 lost films
Silent American Western (genre) films
1920s American films
1920s English-language films